Raja Muhammad Javed Ikhlas (born 5 October 1955) is a Pakistani politician who had been a member of the National Assembly of Pakistan, from June 2013 to May 2018. Previously, he had been a member of the Provincial Assembly of Punjab from 1985 to 1999.

Early life
He was born on 5 October 1955 in Tehsil Gujar Khan, District Rawalpindi.

Political career
He was elected to the Provincial Assembly of Punjab from Constituency PP-11 (Rawalpindi) for the first time in 1985 Pakistani general election.

He was re-elected to the Provincial Assembly of Punjab from Constituency PP-11 (Rawalpindi) as a candidate of Islami Jamhoori Ittehad (IJI) in 1988 Pakistani general election and served as Parliamentary Secretary for Forestry, Wildlife and Fisheries.

He was re-elected to the Provincial Assembly of Punjab from Constituency PP-11 (Rawalpindi) as a candidate of IJI for the third time in 1990 Pakistani general election and served as Parliamentary Secretary for Housing, Physical and Environmental Planning and Development.

He was re-elected to the Provincial Assembly of Punjab from Constituency PP-11 (Rawalpindi) as a candidate of Pakistan Muslim League (N) (PML-N) for the fourth time in 1993 Pakistani general election.

He was re-elected to the Provincial Assembly of Punjab from Constituency PP-11 (Rawalpindi) as a candidate of PML (N) for the fifth time in 1997 Pakistani general election.

He joined Pakistan Muslim League (Q) (PML-Q) in 2001.

He was elected as Nazim of Rawalpindi in 2005. He later also served as District Naib Nazim of Rawalpindi.

He was elected to the National Assembly of Pakistan as a candidate of PML-N from Constituency NA-51 (Rawalpindi-II) in 2013 Pakistani general election. In 2014, he was appointed as Federal Parliamentary Secretary for Cabinet Secretariat, Establishment and Capital Administration and Development Division.

References

People from Gujar Khan
Punjabi people
Mayors of places in Pakistan
Living people
Pakistani MNAs 2013–2018
Politicians from Rawalpindi
1955 births
Punjab MPAs 1985–1988
Punjab MPAs 1988–1990
Punjab MPAs 1990–1993
Punjab MPAs 1993–1996
Punjab MPAs 1997–1999